Edward Leante (fl. 1374 – 1380), of Shaftesbury, Dorset,  was an English Member of Parliament.

He was related to John Leante, MP for Shaftesbury in 1383. Their exact connection is unknown.

He was a Member (MP) of the Parliament of England for Shaftesbury in 1386. He was Mayor of Shaftesbury in 1374–75 and 1379–80.

References

14th-century births
Year of death missing
English MPs 1386
Mayors of Shaftesbury